The 1975–76 English football season was Aston Villa's 76th in the Football League and their first season in the top division for eight years.

In October 1975, at the age of 19, Andy Gray moved south to newly promoted Villa for £110,000.

10 April 1976: Liverpool draw 0–0 against Aston Villa.

Dave Richardson joined Aston Villa in 1976 as Youth Development Officer.

UEFA Cup
Having won the League Cup in the previous season, Villa qualified for Europe for the first time.

League table

First team squad
  Jake Findlay, Goalkeeper, 21 
  James Cumbes, Goalkeeper, 	31
  John Burridge, Goalkeeper, 23 
  Leighton Phillips, Defender, 25 
  Chris Nicholl, Centre-Back, 28 
  Ian Ross, Centre-Back, 27 
  Charlie Aitken, Left-Back, 33
  John Robson, Left-Back, 25 
  Bobby McDonald, Left-Back, 20
  John Gidman, Right-Back, 21 
  Keith Masefield, Right-Back, 18 
  Gordon Cowans, Midfielder, 16 
  Frank Pimblett, Central Midfield, 18
  Dennis Mortimer, Midfielder, 23
  Ian Hamilton, Central Midfield, 24
  Frank Carrodus, Forward, 26
  Ray Graydon, Forward, 27
  Stephen Hunt, Forward, 19
  Brian Little, Forward, 21
  Andy Gray, Centre-Forward, 19
  Keith Leonard, Forward, 24
  Sammy Morgan, Centre-Forward, 28

References

External links
AVFC History: 1975-76 season

Aston Villa F.C. seasons
Aston Villa F.C. season